Maximum Exposure (also known as Max X) is an American reality TV program showcasing video clips on a variety of subjects.  It ran from October 7, 2000 until May 25, 2002. As its various slogans attest, the show was targeted at teens and young adults. The program also showed videos from other reality shows, especially its predecessor Real TV, and was noted both for its fast-paced action and its analysis of slow-motion replays.

Outline
The Executive Producers were brothers Mack and Bradley Anderson of First Television. Cam Brainard (better known as the narrator of This Week in Baseball and the announcer for Disney Channel) narrated the show, while credited as the "Smart-Aleck Announcer Dude." Each episode was an hour long and aired in syndication from 2000 to 2002, with reruns until 2004. The show was produced by Paramount Domestic Television and RTV News.

Syndication
At one point, it was re-aired on Spike TV from 2003 to 2006, and the Fox Reality Channel from 2005 to 2008. Also, reruns aired on WGN America and in some syndication markets. In India, Maximum Exposure is currently being aired on Spark Big CBS Channel. In Estonia Meeletu Maailm (Maximum Exposure) is currently being aired on TV6. In Australia, the program aired on FOX8 from 2006 to 2007, and reruns are still aired from time to time. While in Malaysia, the show had previously been aired in TV2 from 2002 to 2003. In 2006 the show aired on ABC-5 (now The 5 Network) in the Philippines that was given the own local name titled Todo Max  and was hosted by Gladys Guevarra with the narrators/co-hosts Nicole Hyala and Chris Tsuper of Love Radio. On AXN Asia, where the series was formerly aired, only 13 episodes in both Seasons 1 and 2 were broadcast, while the remaining episodes from both seasons was not aired due to censorship on immature content which was not suitable for young viewers.

Running gags

Max X had a series of running gags throughout the duration of the show.
Dudes: Most males on the show's videos are referred to as "dudes."
The La-dies: Brainard is usually heard ogling at attractive women which he refers to as "la-dies."
"Sweet" mullets: Brainard takes the time in videos to point out and make fun of people with mullets.
"Oh yeah!": One of Brainard's favorite sayings.
 Use of Telestrator: Brainard often uses a yellow colored telestrator to highlight certain parts of videos.  He often uses this to point out sweet mullets.
"Good eatin'": Usually used in conjunction with animal videos.  As in, "Remember, them monkeys is good eatin'" or "Hyenas say dik-dik is good eatin'."
Double negatives: Quite common on the show and used for comedic effect, such as, "In Bizarro world, cops don't shoot nobody."
Cigarettes: Brainard usually points out people's inability to let go of their cigarette when either they or someone else is in grave danger.
Stereotypes: Max X routinely makes fun of foreigners, including the French, the Russians, and the Canadians, especially those who are intoxicated. Running gags include how "dirty" France is and how "boring" Canada is.
Variable Speed: When a clip is replayed, a menu comes up on the left hand side of the screen with the Variable Speed controls.  Brainard usually says something like, "Let's see that again," prompting the menu.  The choices include Slo-Mo, Frame by Frame, Super Slo-Mo, High Speed, and Replay.
Image Enhancement: similar to the "Variable Speed" menu, but with features to detail the replay of a clip.  The choices are Zoom, Enlarge, Extreme Close-Up, Highlight (Isolation), Night Vision, Thermal Vision, Color Enhancement, and Resolution.
Camera Angle: similar to the "Variable Speed" menu, but with different angles of the replay of the clip if it was filmed on multiple cameras.
Max X List: The top clips (usually three to five) for each episode are counted down at the end of the episode as the Max X List.
Yellow Arrows: Yellows arrows appear suddenly around limbs that are broken in multiple places.  Each arrow appearance is accompanied with a very quick cow bell sound effect.

Episodes
Each episode of the 52 produced for the series had a particular theme:

Season 1: 2000-2001

Season 2: 2001-2002

See also
 Real TV

References

External links
 

2000 American television series debuts
2002 American television series endings
2000s American reality television series
2000s American video clip television series
Television series by CBS Studios
First-run syndicated television programs in the United States
English-language television shows